Firemonkeys Studios is an Australian video game developer and publisher of video games, based in Melbourne, Victoria. In May 2011, Electronic Arts announced the acquisition of Firemint for an undisclosed sum, making it an in-house studio for EA Interactive. IronMonkey Studios were also taken under EA Interactive's wing back in 2010. In January 2011, Firemint acquired fellow Australian video game developer Infinite Interactive, best known for the Puzzle Quest series. In July 2012, Firemint announced a post on their blog that Firemint would merge with IronMonkey Studios by EA and merge their names into Firemonkeys. All-new games, including Need for Speed: Most Wanted and Real Racing 3, are released with the new company name.

Acquisition
Electronic Arts, with a market capitalization of US$6.7 billion, announced the acquisition of Melbourne-based gaming studio Firemint overnight in a press release for an undisclosed amount. Firemint is recognised as one of the leading game developers on the iOS platform. According to Barry Cottle, General Manager of EA Interactive "The Firemint team is remarkable for its critical and commercial success. Having them as part of EA will accelerate our position as worldwide leader in game development for mobile devices and online gaming platforms." In January, Murray told SmartCompany the work-for-hire market is growing thin, especially as the Australian dollar continues to climb. Coming under the EA banner will give the company security.

Layoffs
In February 2019, Electronic Arts announced that 40 to 50 of Firemonkeys 200 staff would be laid off, to focus the studio more on live services. This equals around 5% of the entire Australian game industries workforce.

Games
Firemint have produced a number of different games for different platforms and different publisher. Starting with the Nicktoons Racing in 2002 for the Game Boy Advance. For several years after publishing their debut game Firemint continued to produce and release games for the Game Boy Advance and mobile devices. It wasn't until early 2008, however, with the release of the Apple iPhone in 2007 did Firemint really expand their games market share. During 2009, Firemint developed their two most popular games, Flight Control and Real Racing. These games went on to achieve great success with the subsequent release of two sequels each, Flight Control HD in 2010, Flight Control Rocket in 2012, Real Racing 2 was released in 2010 and Real Racing 3 in 2013.

Released

Awards
Firemint was awarded the Arts and Entertainment Award for being amongst the most successful exporters in 2009 at the Australian Export Awards in November.

References

External links

Australian companies established in 1999
2011 mergers and acquisitions
Electronic Arts
Video game companies established in 1999
Video game companies of Australia
Video game development companies
Video game publishers
Companies based in Melbourne
Australian subsidiaries of foreign companies